Zagré is a French surname. Notable people with the surname include:

Anne Zagré (born 1990), Belgian hurdler
Arthur Zagré (born 2001), French footballer 
Ben Aziz Zagré (born 1998), Burkinabé footballer
Calixte Zagré (died 2011), Burkinabé football manager

See also
 Žagre 

French-language surnames